Acompsia muellerrutzi is a moth of the family Gelechiidae. It is found on Corsica and possibly Sardinia.

The wingspan is 15–16 mm for males. The forewings are dark brown, mottled with light grey and yellow scales. The hindwings are dark grey. Adults are on wing from late June to early July.

References

Moths described in 1925
Acompsia
Moths of Europe